The 2013 Porsche Mobil 1 Supercup season was the 21st Porsche Supercup season. It began on 12 May on Circuit de Catalunya and finished on 3 November at Yas Marina Circuit, after nine races, all of which were support events for the 2013 Formula One season. A new car was introduced for the season as the Porsche 991 – the internal designation for the seventh-generation Porsche 911 – replaced the Porsche 997.

Three-time champion René Rast did not return to defend his title, opting to focus on the ADAC GT Masters, the FIA GT Series and the Blancpain Endurance Series, where he would compete for Belgian Audi Club WRT. BTCC champion and former WTCC driver Alain Menu joined the series with his own team, FACH Auto Tech.

Ahead of the final round of the series in Abu Dhabi, Monégasque-based British driver Sean Edwards held a championship lead of eighteen points over Denmark's Nicki Thiim, with Michael Ammermüller of Germany the only other driver to remain within contention for winning the title. Edwards was killed on 15 October 2013 at Queensland Raceway in Willowbank, Australia, while instructing a member of the public at a private test session. Thiim ultimately won the championship, after he won both races in Abu Dhabi; Edwards ended up second overall, finishing three points ahead of Ammermüller.

Changes for 2013

Technical
After 20 years, the sequential manual gearbox shifters were replaced by newly-mandatory sequential semi-automatic paddle-shifters respectively for all Porsche Mobil 1 Supercup cars to make easier shifting rather than manual shifters.

Teams and drivers

Notes

Race calendar and results

Championship standings

Drivers' Championship

† – Drivers did not finish the race, but were classified as they completed over 90% of the race distance.

References

External links
The Porsche Mobil 1 Supercup website
Porsche Mobil 1 Supercup Online Magazine

Porsche Supercup seasons
Porsche Supercup